Wormwood (stylized as 'WORMWO0D') is a 2017 American six-part docudrama miniseries directed by Errol Morris and released on Netflix on December 15, 2017. The series is based on the life of a scientist, Frank Olson, who worked for a secret government biological warfare program (the USBWL) at Fort Detrick, Maryland. It focuses on the events leading up to and following his controversial death, which the US government originally claimed was a tragic accident, but later admitted was likely a suicide, caused by a mental breakdown brought on after being unknowingly dosed with LSD, while at a meeting with colleagues from the CIA who were involved in Project MKUltra. It also follows Frank Olson's son in the present day, and discusses his belief that his father may have been murdered due to being perceived as a potential security risk. Interspersed between interviews and archival footage, are live action reenactments of the final days of Frank Olson's life and the various theories involving his death.

Synopsis
Wormwood is told through Eric Olson, the son of Frank Olson, an American biological warfare scientist and Central Intelligence Agency (CIA) employee, who died under mysterious circumstances in 1953.

Nine days after Olson was covertly dosed with LSD by his CIA supervisor as part of Project MKUltra, he plunged to his death from the window of a hotel room in New York City. His death was initially regarded as a suicide, but subsequent investigations have raised questions of a coverup of an alleged murder.

The title Wormwood is a double literary allusion: first to the Bible verse about a star that infects one-third of Earth's waters and makes them bitter and poisonous, a reference to biological weapons (in particular, allegations of biological warfare in the Korean War), and the 'bitter' effect on Eric Olson of his 60-year search for a resolution regarding the death of his father; secondly, to a line in Hamlet (whose story arc the documentary suggests parallels Eric's own life), when Hamlet whispers, "Wormwood, Wormwood," at the moment its play-within-a-play implies evidentially that his father was, in fact, assassinated.  The documentary ends with Eric Olson describing the quest for the truth about his father's death as "Wormwood", having consumed his whole life and with no possibility that any definitive answer, positive or negative, would have released him from the bitterness of the loss anyway. Errol Morris said that "What Wormwood tries to do is tell a story about how we know what we know and how reliable is that knowledge."

A key piece of evidence the film relies on is a CIA assassination manual from 1953, which instructs agents, "The most efficient accident, in simple assassination, is a fall of 75 feet or more onto a hard surface."

Cast

Interviews
 Eric Olson
David Rudovsky, family attorney
Seymour Hersh
 Stephen Saracco

Reenactments
 Peter Sarsgaard as Frank Olson – Biochemist
 Molly Parker as Alice Olson – Wife
 Christian Camargo as Dr. Robert Lashbrook – CIA
 Scott Shepherd as Lt. Col. Vincent Ruwet
 Tim Blake Nelson as Sidney Gottlieb
 Jimmi Simpson as CIA agent
 Bob Balaban as Dr. Harold A. Abramson – Allergist
 Michael Chernus as Dr. James Starrs
 Stephen DeRosa as Armond Pastore - Hotel Night Manager
 Chance Kelly as Wet Works #2
 Michael Chernus as Mal (minder)

Production
In order to be eligible for the Academy Award for Best Documentary Feature at the 90th Academy Awards, the series was recut into a continuous feature after the Academy of Motion Picture Arts and Sciences (AMPAS) ruled that multi-part documentary series (such as 2017 winner O.J.: Made in America) were ineligible. However, the series was rejected from consideration by AMPAS for the documentary feature category, although it remains eligible in all other categories.

Episodes

Release
The series was first screened at the 74th Venice International Film Festival and Telluride Film Festival in September 2017.

Reception
The New York Times awarded it a NYT Critic's Pick with reviewer A. O. Scott saying "Mr. Morris presents a powerful historical argument in the guise of a beguiling work of cinematic art — and vice versa." Matt Zoller Seitz, writing for Vulture.com, "The filmmaking gathers all the bits and pieces of the story together and arranges them in ways that are clever, surprising, and so aggressively (and deliberately) self-conscious that there are times when the whole thing gets close to turning into an intellectualized formal exercise...there’s never a moment where Olson or Morris fail to fascinate." Vanity Fair called it "one of the most original things you’ll see all year."

On review aggregator website Rotten Tomatoes, the series holds an approval rating of 90% based on 39 reviews, and an average rating of 7.8/10.

References

External links
 

2017 American television series debuts
2017 American television series endings
2010s American drama television series
2010s American documentary television series
Netflix original documentary television series
English-language Netflix original programming
Films directed by Errol Morris
Films produced by Errol Morris
Science docudramas
Television series set in 1953
Television shows set in New York City